Pazufloxacin (INN) is a fluoroquinolone antibiotic. It is sold in Japan under the brand names  Pasil and Pazucross.

See also 
 Quinolones

References 

Fluoroquinolone antibiotics
Cyclopropanes
Carboxylic acids
Nitrogen heterocycles
Oxygen heterocycles
Heterocyclic compounds with 3 rings